St Lanfranc enthroned between St John the Baptist and St Liberius is an oil painting by Cima da Conegliano dating to 1515–16. It is now in the Fitzwilliam Museum, Cambridge. It shows saint Lanfranc on a throne, between John the Baptist and Saint Liberius.

References

Paintings by Cima da Conegliano
Paintings in the collection of the Fitzwilliam Museum
1515 paintings